Martin Wiehle (born 23 October 1926 in Breslau), is a German historian.

Life 
During the Second World War, Wiehle was a German soldier in the Flak and the Kriegsmarine from 1943 to 1945. In the post-war period, he worked as a farm labourer in the  until 1946, before he was then employed as a miner in Rositz in Thuringia until 1948. This was then followed by specialist training at the librarian school in Jena from 1948 to 1951. He worked from 1951 to 1954 as a librarian at the Landesstelle für Bibliothekswesen, first in Jena, later in Weimar. In 1954, he became director of the public library and "district library Wilhelm Weitling" in Magdeburg. He held this position for more than three decades until 1991. From 1957 to 1963, Wiehle completed a distance learning course in history at Berlin's Humboldt University, from which he came out as a graduate historian. 

From 1955, he published works on historical and biographical topics. His main focus was on regional and library history as well as library-related publications. Among his merits are several works on the history of the Magdeburg region, including the Magdeburger Börde and the Altmark. He also contributed to the Magdeburger Biographisches Lexikon published in 2002.

Work 
 450 Jahre Magdeburger Stadtbibliothek, 1975, publisher
 Beiträge zur Weitlingforschung, vol. 1, 1986
 Schätze der Stadtbibliothek Magdeburg, 1992
 Magdeburger Persönlichkeiten, 1993, 
 Altmark-Persönlichkeiten, 1999, 
 Bördepersönlichkeiten, 2001,

References 

 Martin Wiehle: Bördepersönlichkeiten. Biografisches Lexikon der Magdeburger Börde (Beiträge zur Kulturgeschichte der Magdeburger Börde und ihrer Randgebiete. Vol. 6). Dr. Ziethen Verlag, Oschersleben 2001, .

External links 
 

20th-century German historians
1926 births
Living people
Writers from Wrocław